The Anti-Terrorism Act is the short title of several pieces of anti-terrorism legislation and may refer to:

 The Anti-Terrorism Act 2005 (Australia)
 The Anti-terrorism Act, 2009 (Bangladesh)
 In Canada:
 The Anti-Terrorism Act, 2001
 The Anti-terrorism Act, 2015
 The Anti-Terrorism Act 1997 (Pakistan)
 The Anti-Terrorism Act of 2020 (Philippines)
 In the United States
 The Antiterrorism and Effective Death Penalty Act of 1996 (federal)
 The Anti-Terrorism Act of 2001 (New York state)